The Minister for Employment and Workplace Relations is a position currently held by Tony Burke in the Albanese ministry since 1 June 2022, following the Australian federal election in 2022.

In the Government of Australia, the minister administers this portfolio through the Department of Employment and Workplace Relations.

Portfolio scope
Other bodies in these portfolios include,:
 Asbestos Safety and Eradication Agency
 Australian Building and Construction Commission (abolished in 2023)
 Comcare
 Fair Work Commission
 Fair Work Ombudsman
 Registered Organisations Commission
 Safe Work Australia
 Workplace Gender Equality Agency

List of Minister for Employment and Workplace Relations
The following individuals have been appointed as the Minister for Employment and Workplace Relations, or any of its precedent titles:

Notes
 Barnard was part of a two-man ministry that comprised Barnard and Gough Whitlam for fourteen days until the full ministry was commissioned.
 Despite the First Rudd ministry ending on 24 June 2010, Gillard was Minister for Employment and Workplace Relations for four days in her first ministry, between 24 June and 28 June 2010, when the revised ministry was commissioned.

List of Assistant Ministers for Science, Jobs and Innovation
The following individuals have been appointed as Assistant Minister for Science, Jobs and Innovation, or any of its precedent titles:

List of Ministers for Industrial Relations

The following individuals have been appointed as Minister for Industrial Relations, or any of its subsequent titles:

References

External links
 

Employment and Workplace Relations
Employment in Australia